Willem Maurits De Bruyn (born Elvira (Elvire) De Bruyn; 4 August 1914 - 13 August 1989), was a Belgian cyclist, who became unofficial women's world champion in 1934.

Biography
De Bruyn was born in 1914 in Erembodegem, East Flanders, Belgium with both male and female sex organs. He was officially inscribed as the daughter of his parents, and raised as a girl, but he soon was considerably taller and stronger than other girls his age, and by the age of fourteen he realised that he was not like other girls. This deeply upset and troubled him, even contemplating suicide.

From 1928 on, after he had finished his schooling, he started working in a cigarette company, but a few months later he began working in his parents' café. In the evenings, he secretly began reading about his condition, not only in medical literature by e.g. Magnus Hirschfeld, but also in mythological and anthropological studies. Eventually he became convinced that he was a hermaphrodite.

He started cycling in 1932. In 1933, he won the women's European Championship in Aalst, Belgium. In 1934 he won the Belgian Championship in Leuven, and the World Championships in Schaerbeek, in front of an estimated 100,000 spectators. He was by then the biggest Belgian star in women's cycling.

But he felt more and more uncomfortable racing and winning against women, when he had "felt like a man, never like a woman". He continued racing to earn money, but deliberately finished second or third instead of winning. He learned about Zdeněk Koubek, a Czech athlete who after being a champion woman athlete had become a man.

By 1936, he dropped his previous female name Elvire and started living as a man named Willy. But as he officially was still registered as a woman named Elvire, he repeatedly came into trouble and lost jobs which were not considered acceptable for women, such as working in a hotel kitchen.

By 1937, after being operated in Paris, he had officially become Willy de Bruijn, and his story is told in four articles titled "How I became a Man" in the newspaper De Dag in April 1937. He continued cycling, but without much success. He opened a pub in Brussels, "Café Denderleeuw", where he presented himself as "Willy ex Elvira de Bruyn" and "Elvira de Bruyn, world champion cycling for women, became a man in 1937".

In 1965, Willy de Bruijn was selling "smoutebollen" at the Belgian village at the New York World's Fair.

He died in 1989 in Antwerp.

A street was named after him in Brussels in July 2019.

Major results
1932: Belgian Championship
27 August 1933: European Championship, Aalst
4 August 1934: Belgian Championship, Leuven
1934: World Championships, Schaerbeek
1934: Sprint event at the track championships, Antwerp

Notes

1914 births
1989 deaths
Sportspeople from Aalst, Belgium
Cyclists from East Flanders
Belgian male cyclists
Transgender men
Transgender sportsmen
Belgium LGBT sportspeople
Belgian transgender people
LGBT cyclists
Intersex men
20th-century Belgian LGBT people